Hermandad de Sigma Iota Alpha, Incorporada, known as SIA, is a Latina-oriented Greek letter intercollegiate sorority. It was founded in 1990 at SUNY Albany, Stony Brook University, SUNY New Paltz, and Rensselaer Polytechnic Institute. The sorority increases awareness of Latina culture and participates in local, national, and international community service, educational, cultural, and social events. It is a member of the National Association of Latino Fraternal Organizations, Inc. (NALFO).

History 
Sigma Iota Alpha was founded on September 29, 1990, by thirteen women from four colleges in New York: University at Albany, SUNY; SUNY New Paltz; Stony Brook University; and Rensselaer Polytechnic Institute. The founders include Dora Maria Abreu, Elizabeth Coats, Tina Colberg, Eulogia Diaz, Angelica Hernandez, Teresa Herrero, Norma Porras, Miriam Ramirez, Saida Rodriguez, Grecia Sanchez, Maria Trujillo, Clara Vasquez and Dulce Williams.

The mission of Hermandad de Sigma Iota Alpha, Inc. is "to formalize, cultivate, and foster bonds amongst each other as sisters and abide by respect, trust, communication, professionalism, and accountability." Alpha Iota Sigma's goals are to increase awareness of the diverse Latino cultures, to promote leadership amongst the sisters, and to serve as "models of excellence in education and achievement amongst women."

The sorority expanded and chartered chapters outside of New York state.

Symbols 
The sorority's colors are gold, red and royal blue. Black and white are used as background colors. The mascots include the unicorn and the Pegasus. Its flower is the red rose and its gem is the white pearl. Its motto is Semper Unum et Inseparabilis or Always One and Inseparable.

Activities
SIA has supported several philanthropic initiatives since its establishment, promoting service on three levels: international, national, and local. Notable international organizations include Children International. National philanthropies include March of Dimes, the National MS Society, One Heartland, and Special Olympics. Its local efforts are called Out Sisters in Action and vary between chapters.

The Solidaridad, Inspiracion y Amistad Community Foundation, Inc. was created in 2004 and collaborates with the sorority to provide scholarships to Latinas and support for building communities.

The R.O.S.E. Mentorship Program is a national educational initiative operated by the graduate chapters. R.O.S.E. serves Latina women ages 14 to 18. It creates community leaders by encouraging service, scholarship and personal development.

Membership
Throughout the last 30+ years, Hermandad de Sigma Iota Alpha, Inc. has grown to include 62 undergraduate chapters, thirteen regional alumnae chapters, and seventeen colonies in the states of New York, Massachusetts, Connecticut, New Jersey, Pennsylvania, Maryland, Virginia, Georgia, Florida, Illinois, Michigan, Texas, California, Kansas, Arkansas, and South Carolina. SIA was the first Latina sorority to be established in Massachusetts and Arkansas.

Chapters and colonies are composed of undergraduate, graduate, and professional women.

Notable members 
Gloria Garayua, film and television actress

Chapters

Undergraduate chapters 
Active chapters are indicated in bold. Inactive chapters are shown in italic.

Notes

Colonies

Regional alumnae chapters

References

Student organizations established in 1990
Hispanic and Latino organizations
National Association of Latino Fraternal Organizations
Student societies in the United States
Latino fraternities and sororities
1990 establishments in New York (state)